Journey's End is a historic site in Boca Grande, Florida. It is located on the beachfront at 18th Street. On March 14, 1985, it was added to the U.S. National Register of Historic Places.

References

External links

 Lee County listings at National Register of Historic Places
 Lee County listings at Florida's Office of Cultural and Historical Programs

National Register of Historic Places in Lee County, Florida
Houses in Lee County, Florida
Gasparilla Island